Albert Elzear Morel (March 5, 1870 – September 7, 1949) was a Canadian ice hockey player for the Ottawa Hockey Club from 1890 to 1894. He was a member of the Ontario championship squads of 1890 to 1893. He played goaltender for the club.

Playing career
Morel is first recorded as the goaltender for Ottawa College in 1890, as a 17-year-old. He joined the Ottawas after first playing against the Ottawas for the College. He joined the Ottawas and played for them for the duration of his education at the college until 1894.

Career statistics

Personal life
While studying and playing hockey, Morel also worked for the Geological Survey as part of survey teams. After 1894, Morel was employed as a private secretary and later as a book-keeper for a lumber company.

References

 

1870 births
1949 deaths
Ottawa Senators (original) players
Ice hockey people from Ottawa
Canadian ice hockey goaltenders